The Mikoyan MiG-27 (NATO reporting name: Flogger-D/J) is a variable-sweep ground-attack aircraft, originally built by the Mikoyan-Gurevich design bureau in the Soviet Union and later licence-produced in India by Hindustan Aeronautics as the Bahadur ("Valiant"). It is based on the Mikoyan-Gurevich MiG-23 fighter aircraft, but optimised for air-to-ground attack.  Unlike the MiG-23, the MiG-27 did not have widespread use outside Russia, as most countries opted for the Mikoyan-Gurevich MiG-23BN and Sukhoi Su-22 instead. It remains in service only with the Kazakh Air Forces in the ground attack role. All Russian, Indian, Sri Lankan and Ukrainian MiG-27s have been retired.

Design and development

The MiG-27 shares the basic airframe of the MiG-23, but with a revised nose – nicknamed "Utkonos" ("Platypus") or "Krokodil Gena" in Russian service, first introduced on the MiG-23B. Dissatisfaction with the MiG-23BN led to the further development of the basic airframe to accommodate a stronger undercarriage, simpler intakes and a shorter exhaust nozzle, without radar in favor of a downward-sloping profile for improved pilot visibility, a laser rangefinder and marked-target seeker. Among its test pilots, it was also called "Balkon" ("Balcony") because of the increased frontal view from the cockpit. Additional cockpit armor was installed, along with a totally new nav/attack system.

Since the MiG-27 was intended to fly most of its missions at low altitude, the MiG-23's variable intake ramps and exhaust nozzles were discarded in favor of a simpler fixed configuration, reducing weight and maintenance requirements. The aircraft also has larger, heavy-duty landing gear to facilitate operation from poorer-quality airfields. In accordance with the MiG-27's strike and low-level attack requirements, provisions were made to mount missiles and precision-guided munitions, as well as retaining a nuclear capability in line with other Soviet combat aircraft by introducing specialized navigation systems.

The improved MiG-27M/D versions were introduced during the 1980s, followed by the -K version, which could carry a much larger range of weapons including tactical nuclear bombs.

Aircraft deployed to Afghanistan were upgraded with the installation of BVP-50-60 flare dispensers and the NAZ-7B emergency survival kit, as well as engine modifications for the hot and high conditions.

Operational history
The MiG-27 saw service with the Soviet Air Force in Afghanistan. Although several Western observers considered the MiG-27 widely exported, confusing it with the MiG-23BN, the aircraft type was only exported to India and Sri Lanka which also utilized the MiG-27 in regional conflicts.

Soviet Union 
The MiG-27 entered frontline service with Soviet Air Force Tactical Aviation in 1975, with the 722nd Regiment. It replaced earlier MiG-23B/BN and outdated Sukhoi Su-7 attack aircraft and equipped 22 of the 40 Soviet fighter-bomber regiments, being deployed all over the Soviet Union and other Warsaw Pact countries. Soviet MiG-27s were permanently deployed to five foreign countries: East Germany, Hungary, Poland, Czechoslovakia and Mongolia until the 1990s.

Soviet forces used the MiG-27 during the later stages of the Afghanistan conflict in 1987–89, which was the only time the Soviets used this aircraft in action. During the initial stages of the war, MiG-27s were not deployed to support ground troops in combat, as the Sukhoi Su-17s of the Turkestan and Central Asian military districts together with DRAAF Su-7s were considered sufficient to support the 40th Army's operations against the Afghan Mujahideen. However, in 1988 it was decided to deploy MiG-27s to support the existing forces in theatre. The 134th APIB, formed of three squadrons of MiG-27D/Ms and MiG-23UB trainers, was deployed to Shindand Air Base in October after extensive training in Kazakhstan. The most modern variant, the MiG-27K, was not deployed due to its lack of armour for the pilot. MiG-27s, in common with all other Soviet attack aircraft in the conflict, were limited in effectiveness by the 5,000 metre (16,400 ft) minimum altitude imposed due to the threat from MANPADs. As such they were only able to deploy unguided bombs and rockets against Afghan targets. Missions included bombing of supply convoys, night bombing of troop concentrations, scattering landmines with cluster munitions, and marking or illuminating targets for artillery with SAB-100 flare bombs. The 134th regiment remained in Afghanistan until the Soviet withdrawal, taking part in the siege of Kandahar. They were withdrawn on the 4th February 1989, flying to Kalay-Mor airbase in the Turkmen SSR where they waited in reserve until March of that year, when they returned to their home base in Kazakhstan.

Around the same time, MiG-27s started to be gradually replaced by more advanced Sukhoi Su-24 and SU-25 aircraft in the ground attack role at home. Other MiG-27 units, such as the 642nd GvAIP, re-equipped with MiG-29 fighters.

Additionally, between 1990 and 1994 a single regiment of MiG-27s (the 88th Separate Fighter Bomber Regiment) served with Soviet Naval Aviation as a way to save the unit from being dissolved under the Treaty on Conventional Armed Forces in Europe.

By the collapse of the Soviet Union, a number of MiG-27s remained in service. These would then be inherited by the air forces of the various former Soviet republics.

Russian Federation 
The Air Force of the Russian Federation inherited most of the Soviet MiG-27s. However, on 1 July 1993 the Air Force decreed that single-engined attack aircraft such as the MiG-27 were to be phased out. Most aircraft were scrapped or left to deteriorate in storage.

Sri Lanka

MiG-27 aircraft entered service with the Sri Lanka Air Force in 2000, with the purchase of four remanufactured MiG-27s from Ukrinmash in May 2000 at US$1.75 million each. This was followed by another ordered for two more in October 2000 at US$1.6 million and a MiG-23UB trainer aircraft for US$900,000. Initially piloted by Ukrainian pilots until SLAF pilots could be trained and was attached to the No. 5 "Jet" Squadron SLAF. During the Eelam War III phase of the Sri Lankan Civil War, they saw considerable action bombing targets and providing close air support. In August 2000, a MiG-27 crashed near Colombo International Airport, killing its Ukrainian pilot. In July 2001, a second MiG-27 was destroyed and another damaged on the ground during an assault on the same air force base by the Liberation Tigers of Tamil Eelam. A MiG-27 crashed into the sea near the airport in June 2004. With the resumption of hostilities in 2006 as peace talks broke down and the Eelam War IV phase of the war starting, MiG-27 were once again flying combat sorties. In 2007, three MiG-27s and a MiG-23UB trainer were overhauled as part of a life-extension program. Four MiG-27s were purchased at US$10 million. This led to the MiG deal scandal. The MiG-27s and the MiG-23UB were reorganized into the newly formed No. 12 Squadron. Another MiG-27 fighter jet crashed on a routine training mission on 13 February 2012 near the Dummalasuriya area at around 1.35 pm. The pilot managed to eject from the jet without sustaining injuries.

India
On 27 May 1999, during the Kargil War, one Indian MiG-27L suffered an engine flameout while firing 80 mm rockets, possibly due to a MANPADS hit. Its pilot, Kambampati Nachiketa, ejected and was captured by Pakistani forces.

In mid-February 2010, India grounded its entire fleet of over 150 of the aircraft after a MiG-27 crashed on 16 February 2010 in Siliguri, West Bengal. The crash was attributed to defects in the R-29 engines of the aircraft, suspected to have occurred during the overhauling of the aircraft by Hindustan Aeronautics Limited (HAL). Another MiG-27 crashed in the Barmer area on 27 January 2015.

India retired the last MiG-27ML squadron on 27 December 2019, when the last two MiG-27 squadrons were retired with  a ceremony at Jodhpur airbase.

Kazakhstan
12 MiG-27s remain in service with the Kazakh Air Force.

Variants

MiG-23B
The first Flogger attack variant was powered by the AL-21F. Only 24 were produced, due a lack of engines (the AL-21F was destined for the Sukhoi Su-17/22 and the Su-24 Fencer). It was armed with the GSh-23L cannon, carrying 200 rounds.

MiG-23BN
Derived from the MiG-23B, but powered by the R29B-300 engine. This gave the advantage of making this variant exportable (the AL-21F was a restricted engine at the time, unlike the R29B-300). The R29B-300 also offered commonality with the MiG-23MS and MiG-23MF fighter variants already sold to the rest of world. It was armed with the GSh-23L cannon, with 200 rounds.

MiG-27 (MiG-23BM)
This was the first in the MiG-27 family to have a canopy without the central frame, suggesting that the ejection seat was designed to directly break through the transparency. The dielectric head above the pylon on the MiG-23 was used on the MiG-27 to house electro-optical and radio-frequency gear instead. It was also the first variant armed with a Gryazev-Shipunov GSh-6-30M Gatling gun. Its NATO reporting name was Flogger-D.

MiG-27K

NATO reporting name: Flogger-J2. The MiG-27K was the most advanced Soviet variant, with a laser designator and compatibility with TV-guided electro-optical weapons. It carried the GSh-6-30 cannon. Around 200 were built.

MiG-27M
NATO reporting name: Flogger-J. This model was a cheaper variant than the MiG-27K, but much better than the MiG-23B, MiG-23BN, and MiG-27 (MiG-23BM), with the electro-optical and radio-frequency heads above the glove pylons deleted. It was first armed with the GSh-6-23M Gatling gun, but this was later replaced by a new 30 mm GSh-6-30 six-barrel cannon with 260 rounds of ammunition in a fuselage gondola. It also received much-improved electronic countermeasure (ECM) systems, and a new PrNK-23K nav/attack system providing automatic flight control, gun firing, and weapons release. However, this modification was not very successful because of the heavy recoil from the new cannon, and bursts longer than two or three seconds often led to permanent damage to the airframe.  Test pilot V. N. Kondaurov described the first firing of the GSh-6-30А:  "As I imposed the central mark on the air target and pressed the trigger to shoot, I heard such noise that I involuntarily drew my hand aside. The whole plane began to vibrate from the shooting and had almost stopped from the strong recoil of the gun. The pilotless target, which was just making a turn ahead of me, was literally disintegrating into pieces. I have hardly come to my senses from unexpectedness and admiration: This is a calibre! Such a beast! If you hit something — it will be plenty enough [to wipe it out]". A total of 200 MiG-27Ms were built from 1978 to 1983, plus 160 for India. Sri Lanka used second-hand Soviet built MiG-27M.

MiG-27D

All MiG-27D are MiG-27s (MiG-23BMs) upgraded to MiG-27M standard. It is very difficult to distinguish from the MiG-27M. 305 were upgraded.

MiG-27ML

This was an export variant of the MiG-27M provided in 1986 to India in knock-down kits for license-assembly. It was the same as the MiG-27M, except the undernose fairing for the infra-red search and track (IRST) sensor had a single window instead of several, like the one on the original MiG-27M. A total of 150 were assembled by India. India refers to this model as the MiG-27M Bahadur, while MiG-27L is the Mikoyan export designation.

MiG-27H

This was a 1988 indigenous Indian upgrade of its license-assembled MiG-27L with French avionics, which provides the same level of performance, but with much reduced size and weight. The capabilities of the aircraft are being enhanced by the incorporation of modern avionics systems consisting primarily of two Multi-Function Displays (MFDs) Mission and Display Processor (MDP), Sextant Ring Laser Gyros (RLG INSI), combined GPS/GLONASS navigation, HUD with UFCP, Digital Map Generator (DMG), jam-resistant Secured Communication, stand-by UHF communication, data link and a comprehensive Electronic Warfare (EW) Suite. A mission planning and retrieval facility, VTR and HUD Camera will also be fitted. The aircraft retains stand-by (conventional) instrumentation, including artificial horizon, altimeter and airspeed indicator, to cater for the failure of HUD and the MFDs. The MiG-27s are also being equipped with the French Agave or Russian Komar radar. The installation of the radar would give the MiG-27 anti-ship and some air-to-air capability. It is expected that at least 140 of the 180 aircraft will be converted from MiG-27MLs.

Operators

The Kazakh Air Force operates at least 12 MiG-27Ms.

Former operators

 The Soviet Air Force passed their aircraft on to successor states.
 
 The Belarusian Air Force inherited a small number of aircraft from the 911th Fighter-Bomber regiment based at Lida. These were scrapped or used as instructional airframes at the Minsk State Aviation College.

 The Russian Air Force retired their aircraft from front-line use. 
 
 Sri Lanka Air Force 

 The Ukrainian Air Force has retired their aircraft.

 The Indian Air Force has retired their aircraft (165 MiG-27Ms licensed built by HAL). The first batch of MiG-27MLs were retired in December 2017. While the final batch was retired from service on 27 December 2019.

 The Afghan Air Force received MiG-27s as military aid from the Soviet Union following the Soviet withdrawal from Afghanistan.

Specifications (MiG-27K)

See also

References

Notes

Bibliography

 Eden, Paul, ed. "Mikoyan MiG-27". Encyclopedia of Modern Military Aircraft. London: Amber Books, 2004. .
 Frawley, Gerard and Jim Thorn. "Mikoyan MiG-27." The International Directory Of Military Aircraft 1996/97. Weston Creek, Australia: Aerospace Publications Pty Ltd, 1996. .
 Green, William and Gordon Swanborough. The Great Book of Fighters. St. Paul, Minnesota, USA: Motorbooks International Publishing, 2001. .
 Gordon, Yefim and Komissarov, Dmitry, "Mikoyan MiG-23 and MiG-27", Crecy Publishing, Manchester, 2019 .
 Wilson, Stewart. Combat Aircraft since 1945. Fyshwick, Australia: Aerospace Publications, 2000. .
 Winchester, Jim, ed. "Mikoyan MiG-27 'Flogger d/J'." Military Aircraft of the Cold War (The Aviation Factfile). London: Grange Books plc, 2006.

External links

 MiG-27 Flogger from Global Security.org
 MiG-27 Flogger from Global Aircraft
 MiG-27 from FAS
 Mikoyan MiG-27 Flogger

MiG-027
1970s Soviet attack aircraft
Single-engined jet aircraft
Aircraft first flown in 1970
Variable-sweep-wing aircraft